Rugabano is a sector (umurenge) in Karongi district, in Western Province, Rwanda. Its office is near Gakuta center, on the foot of Gisunzu mount. Its capital is Rugabano market, in a center of shops and cattle market (isoko ry'inka).

The sector also contains Ngoma, where Baziruwiha Jean Claude was born.

References

Populated places in Rwanda